Pither is a surname. Notable people with the surname include:

 Alfred George Pither (1908–1971), Australian Air Force officer
 Chris Pither, New Zealand racing driver
 Herbert Pither, New Zealand aviator
 Luke Pither, Canadian hockey player
 George Pither, English football player